María Aurelia Paula Martínez Suárez (23 February 1927 – 1 May 2020), known professionally as Silvia Legrand, was an Argentine actress. She co-starred with her twin sister Mirtha Legrand, in a number of films and was the sister of director José A. Martínez Suárez. She starred in some 20 films between 1940 and 1972.

Selected filmography

Educating Niní (1940)
 Seven Women (1944)

References

External links
 
 

1927 births
2020 deaths
Argentine film actresses
Argentine twins
Argentine people of Spanish descent
People from General López Department